Pedro María Morantes (1865–1918) was a Venezuelan lawyer, activist and novelist who went by the pseudonym Pío Gil.

1865 births
1918 deaths
19th-century Venezuelan lawyers
People from San Cristóbal, Táchira
Venezuelan activists
Venezuelan novelists
Venezuelan male writers
Male novelists
20th-century Venezuelan lawyers